"The Way I Talk" is a song recorded by American country artist Morgan Wallen. The song was co-written by Jessi Alexander, Ben Hayslip, and Chase McGill. It was Wallen's debut single and the lead single from his debut studio album If I Know Me.

Background
The song was written by Ben Hayslip, Jessi Alexander, and Chase McGill, but Wallen felt a personal connection to the song upon hearing it. He stated "It’s about “the things that I’m proud of and the way that I live, and it was just a perfect match to me."

Critical reception
Whiskey Riff gave a favourable review of the song, highlighting the lyric “Man it ain’t my fault, I just live the way I talk” stating they "wish more people would live that way as well". The Country Note noted Wallen's "dynamic vocal delivery", stating the track "features a sound straight out of the modern South, combining elements of both country and rock".

Commercial performance
"The Way I Talk" reached peaks of #35 on Billboard Hot Country Songs, #30 on Country Airplay, and #50 on Canada Country. This marked Wallen's first entries on each chart. It has been certified Gold by Music Canada.

Music video
The music video was directed by TK McKamy and premiered on April 6, 2017. The video featured Wallen and his friends doing various activities such as chasing chickens or boxing for fun.

Track listings
Digital download - single
 "The Way I Talk" – 3:28

Digital download - EP
 "The Way I Talk" – 3:28
 "Chain Smokin'" – 3:42
 "Whiskey Glasses" – 3:54
 "Stand Out" – 3:14
 "American Nights" – 3:22

Charts

Weekly charts

Year-end charts

Certifications

Release history

References

2016 debut singles
2016 songs
Morgan Wallen songs
Songs written by Jessi Alexander
Songs written by Ben Hayslip
Songs written by Chase McGill
Song recordings produced by Joey Moi
Big Loud singles
Music videos directed by TK McKamy